Half Moon Bay is a coastal city in San Mateo County, California, United States, approximately  south of San Francisco. Its population was 11,795  2020 census. Immediately north of Half Moon Bay is Pillar Point Harbor and the unincorporated community of Princeton-by-the-Sea. Half Moon Bay is known for Mavericks, a big-wave surf location. It is called Half Moon Bay because of its crescent shape.

Originally an agricultural outpost to Mission San Francisco de Asís, the town was founded in the 1840s first as San Benito, and then as its Anglo fishing community grew, it was renamed Spanishtown. In 1874, it was again renamed Half Moon Bay. After rail and road connections in the early 1900s, the town grew. The foggy weather of the coast made the town a popular destination for booze-running during Prohibition.

The city's infrastructure is heavily integrated with the coast, including the Pillar Point Harbor, major roads, and the fire department. The economy of Half Moon Bay is dominated by a handful of businesses, the biggest of which is the Ritz-Carlton Half Moon Bay which employs 500 people and is a major source of property tax and tourism income for the city. Because of this geography,  found that the city had over 123 buildings vulnerable to sea level rise.

History 

Half Moon Bay began as a rural agricultural area, primarily used by Mission San Francisco de Asís (established in 1776) for grazing cattle, horses, and oxen. After the Mission's secularization, Tiburcio Vásquez received the Rancho Corral de Tierra Mexican land grant in 1839 and Candelario Miramontes was granted Rancho Miramontes (later known as Rancho San Benito) in 1841.

The community began to develop in the 1840s as San Mateo County's first real town. Originally, San Benito, the town was renamed Spanishtown and attracted a thriving fishing industry in addition to its continued importance to coastal agriculture. Spanishtown became a racially diverse community, settled by Canadians, Chinese, English, Germans, Irish, Mexicans, Italians, Scots, Portuguese, and Pacific Islanders. Regular stagecoach service was established with San Mateo; coaches also served Purissima, Lobitos, and San Gregorio. Levy Brothers opened a department store downtown. Spanishtown was officially renamed Half Moon Bay in 1874.

The area grew very slowly, even after the Ocean Shore Railroad began serving the community in 1907. The construction of Pedro Mountain Road in 1914 provided better access to San Francisco and probably contributed to the railroad's demise by 1920. The USS DeLong ran aground at Half Moon Bay on December 1, 1921. During Prohibition "rum runners" took advantage of dense fog and hidden coves in the area to serve several roadhouses and inns, some of which operate today as restaurants (e.g., Moss Beach Distillery). Real growth in the area came after World War II with the construction of numerous subdivisions, eventually leading to Half Moon Bay's incorporation in 1959. The city preserves a historic downtown district that has buildings dating as far back as 1869.

2008 economic downturn and subsequent recovery 

In 2008, financial setbacks endangered the city's viability. The economic crisis severely affected tourism, which generates the most revenue, and just when the city had finalized an $18million settlement over a property lawsuit. As the municipal budget was typically $14million or less, city fathers had issued bonds with annual payments of approximately $1 million over 25years. As a result of these obstacles, the threat of bankruptcy was very real. Dozens of meetings were held to decide where to cut the budget and finally, 75percent of municipal employees were laid off and replaced with contract workers. Employee contributions toward retirement benefits were also raised. The city council sought to regain the money paid in the settlement, believing that it should have been paid by the city's insurers. A lawsuit against the insurers was decided in 2013 and the insurer was ordered to pay the city more than $13million; the Association of Bay Area Governments partially covered the costs of the lawsuit.

The city's finances improved afterward. It was able to retire the first of its two 30-year Judgment Obligation Bonds (2009A Series Bonds) 20years early. The early retirement was expected to save the city over $426,000 in annual General Fund expenses starting in 201516.

As of the publication of the Fiscal Year 201516 Budget the General Fund budget was balanced and had a structural surplus of $4million.

2023 mass shootings 

On January 23, 2023, mass shootings occurred in Half Moon Bay. A spree killer opened fire at two farms with a semi-automatic pistol, killing seven people and critically injuring an eighth person. A 66-year-old suspect was taken into custody after he arrived in his SUV at the parking lot of the sheriff's office substation.

Geography 

Neighboring towns include El Granada, Princeton-by-the-Sea, Moss Beach, and Montara to the north and Purissima, San Gregorio, and Pescadero to the south.

The town is situated on a bay of the same name. Major local industries include agriculture (houseplants, floriculture, Christmas trees, pumpkins, artichokes), fishing, and tourism. Historically, Half Moon Bay had been known as San Benito and Spanishtown. A 2022 study of the effects of sea level rise, found that both major tourism attractions, and other infrastructure would be under threat from projected Sea level rise caused by global warming. The study found at least 123 buildings, including the Ritz Carlton (a major employer for the town), Pigeon Point Lighthouse and the Pescadero Cal Fire Station to be flooded under five feet of sea level rise.

A popular spot at Half Moon Bay is the 'Jetty,' or as it is sometimes called, 'The Breakwater.' This is a man-made break with unusual waves shaped by reflections from the breakwater at Pillar Point Harbor. Creeks in Half Moon Bay include Frenchmans, Pilarcitos and Naples.

Montara State Marine Reserve & Pillar Point State Marine Conservation Area extend offshore from Montara, just north of Half Moon Bay. Like underwater parks, these marine protected areas help conserve ocean wildlife and marine ecosystems.

Climate 

Half Moon Bay usually has mild weather throughout the year. Under the Köppen climate classification, it has a cool summer Mediterranean climate (Köppen Csb). Typical of Northern California, most of the rain falls from November to April. Snowfall along the coast in Half Moon Bay has never been measurable; however, snow flurries were observed on December 12, 1972, February 5, 1976, and February 23, 2023. There is often fog and overcast during the night and morning hours, usually clearing offshore during the afternoon. Persistent sea breezes help to moderate the climate along the coast; farther from the ocean, in places such as Pilarcitos Creek, days are often warmer and nights cooler than on the coast. For the 37th parallel north, the mild summer temperatures of Half Moon Bay are unmatched across the board. Relatively nearby inland cities see significantly warmer temperatures at the same time. Despite the low latitude and strong maritime influence, nights remain very cool, even in the summer.

There is an average of 86days with measurable rainfall.

Demographics

2010

 2010 United States Census reported that Half Moon Bay had a population of 11,324. The racial makeup of Half Moon Bay was 8,580 (75.8%) White, 82 (0.7%) African American, 71 (0.6%) Native American, 490 (4.3%) Asian, 9 (0.1%) Pacific Islander, 1,710 (15.1%) from other races, and 382 (3.4%) from two or more races. Hispanic or Latino of any race were 3,563 persons (31.5%).

The Census reported that 11,306 people (99.8% of the population) lived in households, 18 (0.2%) lived in non-institutionalized group quarters, and 0 (0%) were institutionalized.

There were 4,149 households, out of which 1,264 (30.5%) had children under the age of 18 living in them, 2,373 (57.2%) were opposite-sex married couples living together, 293 (7.1%) had a female householder with no husband present, 156 (3.8%) had a male householder with no wife present. There were 208 (5.0%) unmarried opposite-sex partnerships, and 41 (1.0%) same-sex married couples or partnerships. 1,067 households (25.7%) were made up of individuals, and 538 (13.0%) had someone living alone who was 65 years of age or older. The average household size was 2.72. There were 2,822 families (68.0% of all households); the average family size was 3.24.

The population was spread out, with 2,533 people (22.4%) under the age of 18, 796 people (7.0%) aged 18 to 24, 2,587 people (22.8%) aged 25 to 44, 3,644 people (32.2%) aged 45 to 64, and 1,764 people (15.6%) who were 65 years of age or older. The median age was 43.2 years. For every 100 females, there were 95.1 males. For every 100 females aged 18 and over, there were 93.8 males.

The homeowner vacancy rate was 1.0%; the rental vacancy rate was 1.9%. 7,645 people (67.5% of the population) lived in owner-occupied housing units and 3,661 people (32.3%) lived in rental housing units.

2000 

 census of 2000, there were 11,842 people, 4,004 households, and 2,774 families residing in the city.

There were 4,004 households, out of which 30.9% had children under the age of 18 living with them, 58.3% were married couples living together, 7.2% had a female householder with no husband present, and 30.7% were non-families. Of all households, 23.1% were made up of individuals, and 9.1% had someone living alone who was 65 years of age or older. The average household size was 2.75 and the average family size was 3.20.

In the city, the population was spread out, with 22.2% under the age of 18, 8.1% from 18 to 24, 31.9% from 25 to 44, 28.2% from 45 to 64, and 9.6% who were 65 years of age or older. The median age was 39 years. For every 100 females, there were 112.8 males. For every 100 females aged 18 and over, there were 115.1 males.

The median income for a household in the city was $78,473, and the median income for a family was $92,204. Males had a median income of $60,913 versus $41,265 for females. The per capita income for the city was $37,963. 6.1% of the population and 3.4% of families were below the poverty line. Of those, 7% are under the age of 18 and 6.2% of those 65 and older were living below the poverty line.

Economy 

 GoPro was started in 2002 in Half Moon Bay, and then moved its headquarters to San Mateo, in 2012
 Odwalla was based in Half Moon Bay, but then relocated its headquarters to Dinuba, on May 31, 2013
 The Institute for the Study of Knowledge Management in Education is headquartered in Half Moon Bay

Top employers 

, the top employers in the city were:

Pillar Point Harbor 

The Pillar Point Harbor at the northern edge of Half Moon Bay offers a protected landing for boats and provides other marine infrastructure. In the late 1980s, a new master plan was developed for the Harbor. A variety of fish species have been identified in the harbor area. At the harbor, fishermen sell crab and fish catches straight off their boats at discount prices directly to the public, and restaurants will filet the fish for purchasers.

The Half Moon Bay Yacht Club has facilities at the harbor.

Arts and culture

Notable buildings 

The city has four sites listed at the National Register of Historic Places: the Methodist Episcopal Church at Half Moon Bay, the William Adam Simmons House, the Robert Mills Dairy Barn, and the James Johnston House.

There is an artist's collective, Colony of Coastside Artists, downtown has several galleries, and there are art classes and workshops available locally.

The Ritz-Carlton Half Moon Bay is a major employer. The hotel was used as the wedding venue for the 2003 comedy film, American Wedding.

Events 

The Half Moon Bay Airport hosts an annual benefit event in April, Pacific Coast Dream Machines, which features aircraft and automobiles. Half Moon Bay also hosts an annual Art and Pumpkin Festival in October.

Parks and recreation 

The region around Half Moon Bay contains several state parks and beaches, including:
 Half Moon Bay State Beach
 Poplar Beach
 San Gregorio State Beach
 Pomponio State Beach
 Fitzgerald Marine Reserve, located north of Half Moon Bay, is a refuge for plants and animals adapted to live at the shoreline.

From 1999 to 2016, it was the location of the annual Titans of Mavericks competition.

Montara Mountain, located North of Half Moon Bay, is a popular outdoor recreation spot and home to the old Highway1.

Government 

Fire protection for the city of Half Moon Bay is provided by the Coastside Fire Protection District, which contracts for service with CalFire.

Law enforcement for the City of Half Moon Bay is provided under a contract with the San Mateo County Sheriff's Office.

According to the California Secretary of State, as of February 10, 2019, Half Moon Bay has 7,549 registered voters. Of those, 3,603 (47.7%) are registered Democrats, 1,380 (18.3%) are registered Republicans, and 2,142 (28.4%) have declined to state a political party.

Education 

The Cabrillo Unified School District serves the city. Schools include Half Moon Bay High School, Cunha Middle School and Hatch Elementary School although many students are bused to other Cabrillo Unified Schools (Farallone View Elementary and El Granada Elementary) in the unincorporated area north of the City and King Mountain off Skyline Boulevard south of Highway92.

The city is served by the Peninsula Library System.

Media 
 Half Moon Bay Review, the city's only newspaper, which has been in existence since 1898
 Coastsider, an on-line community news site
 Half Moon Bay Patch, online newspaper

Transportation 

Primary road access is via State Route 1 (the Cabrillo Highway) from the north and south, and State Route 92 from the east.

The city is served by Half Moon Bay Airport.

SamTrans routes294 and117 provide service to Half Moon Bay from the Hillsdale Caltrain station in San Mateo and Linda Mar in Pacifica, respectively.

In popular culture 

The World War II United States Navy seaplane tender USS Half Moon (AVP-26) was named for Half Moon Bay and retained the name when serving as a United States Coast Guard weather reporting ship USCGC Half Moon for more than 20 years after the war.

The album Half Moon Bay was recorded by jazz pianist Bill Evans in 1973 at the Bach Dancing and Dynamite Society in Half Moon Bay.

The 1992 movie Raising Cain, which takes place and was filmed on the San Francisco Peninsula mentions a fictitious Half Moon Marsh.

Notable people

 John Cardiel, skateboarder
 Jon Miller, Hall of Fame broadcaster for the San Francisco Giants
 Charlee Minkin (born 1981), Olympic judoka
 John Montefusco, former pitcher for the San Francisco Giants and Atlanta Braves
 Jay Moriarity, surfer and free diver, youngest person to surf Mavericks, depicted in the film Chasing Mavericks
 Al Pereira, professional wrestler, twice holder of the European Heavyweight Championship
 Dorothy Wagner Puccinelli, muralist and artist
 Richard Rhodes, Pulitzer Prize-winning author and historian
 Phil Schiller, senior vice president at Apple

See also

References

External links 

 
 Half Moon Bay Chamber of Commerce & Visitors' Bureautourist information
 Half Moon Bay Reviewnewspaper serving the San Mateo County Coastside since 1898
 California State Waters Map SeriesOffshore of Half Moon BayUnited States Geological Survey

 
Cities in San Mateo County, California
Cities in the San Francisco Bay Area
Populated coastal places in California
Incorporated cities and towns in California